Hassab may refer to:

 Hassab operation, an elective surgical procedure in portal hypertension.
 Dr. Mohammed Aboul-Fotouh Hassab, an Egyptian surgeon.
 Hassab hospital, a hospital in Alexandria.